Weaving is assembling threads into cloth. 

Weaving or weave may also refer to:
 Weaving (surname), a surname (and list of people with the name)
 Weave (digital printing)
 Weaving (horse), behavior pattern
 Weaving (knitting)
 Weaving (mythology), a literary theme
 Weave (Forgotten Realms), a fictional magic-producing fabric in Forgotten Realms
 Basket weaving
 Hair weave
 Mozilla Weave
 Weaving, field combination deinterlacing of television images
 Weaving, program transformation in Aspect-oriented programming
 Weaving, grade-separation in vehicular traffic

See also
Bob and weave